The Urecar was an English automobile manufactured in Bournemouth only in 1923.  It was powered by an 8-9 hp four-cylinder Dorman engine; apparently only one was built.

See also
 List of car manufacturers of the United Kingdom

References
David Burgess Wise, The New Illustrated Encyclopedia of Automobiles.

Defunct motor vehicle manufacturers of England
Companies based in Bournemouth